Matthias Koeberlin (born 28 March 1974, Mainz) is a German actor and reciter. His work includes the British-German co-production The Sinking of the Laconia (2010, UK premiere, 2011) and 2017 in German television series Charité he played role of German physician Emil Behring.

References

External links

Actors from Mainz
1974 births
Living people
German male television actors